The Backwoods Barbie Tour was the ninth headlining concert tour by American recording artist, Dolly Parton. Visiting the United States, Northern Europe and Canada, the tour supported her 42nd studio album, Backwoods Barbie. The tour was well received by critics and spectators alike, earning more than nine million dollars in 2008. The European leg of the tour was the most successful outing of Parton's touring history, performing for 170,000 spectators in the United Kingdom, Sweden, Denmark, Norway and the Netherlands. The tour was expected to reach Australia as well but this did not come to fruition.

Background
After completing her previous trek, Parton focused on the upcoming musical 9 to 5: The Musical and recording her next album. The singer also started her own independent record label after being told she was "too old" for mainstream music. While promoting the song, "Better Get to Livin'", Parton announced her upcoming tour. The first dates revealed in Los Angeles, New York City and Chicago served as rehearsal shows before Parton played in arenas, theatres, amphitheatres and stadiums in North America and Northern Europe. The tour was set to run from February to June, however, it was expanded several times to meet public demand.

To introduce the tour, Parton remarked:"I had this product that I wanted to sell. It was my performing. I try to think of it as the music business, and you can't just throw it out to anyone and then move on to a new product. So I got involved. God created me, but he gave me the go-ahead to do what I could with it."

Before the tour began, Parton positioned the first round of dates in the United States due to back issues. The singer poked fun at her condition saying, "I know I have been breaking my neck and bending over backwards trying to get my new 'Backwoods Barbie' CD and world tour together, but I didn't mean to hurt myself doing it, But hey, you try wagging these puppies around a while and see if you don't have back problems. Seriously though, the doctors said I will be good as new in a few weeks, and I can't wait to get back out there." The tour began in March instead of early February. After her rehearsal dates, the tour officially commenced on April 22, 2008, at the Benedum Center for the Performing Arts in Pittsburgh, Pennsylvania.

Death rumor
After Parton finished her European leg, rumors circulated the Internet of her death. It was believed this rumor began at a high school football game (in Tennessee) as the crowd gave a moment of silence for her death. FOX News later reported the singer died in early August of congestive heart failure at the Fort Sanders Sevier Medical Center. Parton and her manager dispelled this rumor, stating the singer was "alive and well", although Parton joked she nearly had a heart attack upon hearing the news of her death, but laughed it off.

Critical reception 
Overall, the majority of feedback from music critics was favorable for the tour. Ben Ratliff (The New York Times) describes Parton's performance at the Radio City Music Hall as nothing short of uplifting. He further comments, Between the songs and her nonstop patter — she is an assassin of dead air — the show was a seminar on the peril of accepting received wisdom, whether the subject was drag queens, the rural poor, working stiffs, politicians, Pentecostalists, young media stars or bosomy women. She granted pretty much everybody a complex interior life, and the power of independent thought. For the same concert, Mandi Bierly (Entertainment Weekly) felt the highlight of the show was Parton's banter. She elaborates, "I never leave a rhinestone unturned", she said, heading to her studded white piano. And, as the headline states, she's got the best stage banter in the business. She's sufficiently quippy, but also shares her life story. After the jump, some of her greatest hits.

During the European leg, the reviews commended Parton's stage personality and interaction with the audience. Edwin McFee (The Belfast Telegraph) thought Parton's concert at the Odyssey Arena proved her star power. He pens, She sings, she dances, she plays no less than six musical instruments and she also tells us stories of her childhood as if we were the first ones to hear them, though Dolly fanatics have probably heard them a million times before. At times it was actually quite surreal listening to evergreen anthems such as Jolene performed with as much passion as if they were recorded only yesterday, and in many ways her show was a masterclass in traditional old school musical theatre. David Sinclair (The Times) found the concert at the Scottish Exhibition and Conference Centre to be "all about the music". He writes, But, in the end, it all came back to the songs. Here she insisted was where the essence of her personality could always be found. 'I might look artificial/ But where it counts I'm real,' she sang in the title track of Backwoods Barbie. And in a funny way, she is.

Madeleine Brindley (Western Mail) believes Parton's concert at the Cardiff International Arena proved her to be the first lady of country and western the world over. Brindley explains, As last night amply demonstrated Dolly has lost none of her songwriting, or story-telling talents, as almost every number was prefaced by a short story, which gave us the tiniest of glimpses into the thought process which drives this diminutive star. David Smyth (Evening Standard) gave the concert at The O2 Arena four out of five stars. Smyth stated, Tracks representing the jolly country pop of her latest album, the knowingly titled Backwoods Barbie, fitted in well, especially the man-baiting 'Shinola'. It was only when she stopped the gabbing and rolled out hits in quick succession that the crowd rose to its feet and remained there. 'Here You Come Again', 'Islands In The Stream', '9 To 5' and the biggest of the big ballads, 'I Will Always Love You', confirmed that while she weaves a good yarn, it's when Dolly Parton sings that she's really on song.

Returning to the United States, the praise for the tour continued. Annie Zaleski (Riverfront Times) writes the performance at the Fabulous Fox Theatre was charming, meeting all expectations. She continues, Also fantastic was the ease with which she transitioned from such seemingly different instruments—all of which were white and covered in rhinestones. For "Thank God I’m a Country Girl", she flew through fiddle, banjo, and harmonica, all feverishly supplied by her "useful and ornamental" hick Chippendale (Steve Summers) who dosey-doed in shirtless abandon in overalls nearby. Evan Rytlewski (Shepherd Express) wrote of Parton's stage persona at her concert at the Riverside Theater, "Parton's hokey facade is a remnant of the old Las Vegas/Grand Ole Opry era of entertainment, and it still dominates her concerts. She spent nearly as much of her performance Monday night sharing stories and cracking jokes as she did singing, proving herself quite the comedian. At 62, she's part-grandmother (she riffed on her poor eyesight and mortality), part-cougar (she ogled a dancing beefcake), and her sharp quips had the audience roaring with laughter."

Set list 
This set list is representative of the August 14 show in West Hollywood, California. It is not representative of all concerts for the duration of the tour

"Two Doors Down"
"Why'd You Come in Here Lookin' Like That"
"Jolene"
"Thank God I'm a Country Girl"
"I'm Little, But I'm Loud"
"Backwoods Barbie"
"White Limozeen"
"Drives Me Crazy"
Shattered Image"
"Coat of Many Colors"
"Only Dreamin'"
Gospel Medley: "Brother Love's Travelling Salvation Show" / "I'll Fly Away" / "When the Saints Go Marching In" / "Old Time Religion" / "Calm on the Water" / "Daddy Was an Old Time Preacher Man"
"Baby I'm Burnin'"
"Better Get to Livin'"
"Shinola"
"The Grass Is Blue"
"Great Balls of Fire"
"Puppy Love"
"Little Sparrow"
"Here You Come Again"
"Islands in the Stream"
"9 to 5"
"I Will Always Love You"
Encore
"He's Alive"
Jesus and Gravity"

Broadcasts and recordings 
The concerts at The O2 Arena in London were filmed for a concert special and DVD release. The concert special, "Dolly: Live in London O2 Arena", aired on PBS in conduction with their summer pledge drive. The concert was later released as a CD/DVD package titled, "Dolly: Live from London". Parton released the live version of "Here You Come Again" to promote the package.

In 2011, the concert was reissued exclusively to Cracker Barrel stores as An Evening With Dolly Parton. The DVD remains unchanged and contains all of the material from the original release. The CD removes most of the songs from the Backwoods Barbie album with the exception of "Only Dreamin'", but adds two bonus unreleased live tracks, "Shattered Image" and "My Tennessee Mountain Home." In stark contrast to the original release, which charted as an album on the Billboard 200 at #195 and sold poorly, An Evening With Dolly Parton reached #2 on the Billboard Music Video Charts and eventually sold well enough to receive a Gold Music Video certification from the RIAA for shipments of over 50,000 copies.

Tour dates

Cancelled shows

Box office score data

Notes

References

External links
Parton's Official Website
Parton's Official Facebook
Parton's Official Myspace
Parton's Official YouTube page
Parton's Official Twitter

Dolly Parton concert tours
2008 concert tours